Henry Joseph Pelham (March 2, 1908 – March 17, 1978) was a Canadian rower who competed in the 1932 Summer Olympics.

In 1932 he was a crew member of the Canadian boat which was eliminated in the repêchage of the coxless fours event.

At the 1930 Empire Games he won the silver medal with the Canadian boat in the coxless fours competition.

External links

1908 births
1978 deaths
Canadian male rowers
Olympic rowers of Canada
Rowers at the 1932 Summer Olympics
Rowers at the 1930 British Empire Games
Commonwealth Games silver medallists for Canada
Commonwealth Games medallists in rowing
Medallists at the 1930 British Empire Games